Thomas Eden may refer to:
 Thomas Eden (politician)
 Thomas Eden (civil servant)
 Thomas Eden (cricketer)
 Thomas Watts Eden, obstetric physician